Micromyrtus monotaxis is a plant species of the family Myrtaceae endemic to Western Australia.

It blooms in between March and December producing white flowers.

It is found on sand plains in the Goldfields-Esperance region of Western Australia in an area centred around Kalgoorlie where it grows in sandy soils.

References

monotaxis
Endemic flora of Western Australia
Myrtales of Australia
Rosids of Western Australia
Plants described in 2002
Taxa named by Barbara Lynette Rye